Trailer Park Boys: The Movie (also known as Trailer Park Boys: Countdown to The Big Dirty and simply Trailer Park Boys) is a 2006 black comedy crime film based on the television series Trailer Park Boys itself a sequel to the 1999 film of the same name. The film follows characters Ricky, Julian, and Bubbles creating a plan for the Big Dirty, one last crime that will enable them to retire from their criminal lives. The film, like the series, was directed and produced by Mike Clattenburg, with Ivan Reitman as an executive producer. It was released in Canada on October 6, 2006, and a limited release in the United States began on January 25, 2008. It has developed into a cult film since then.

Plot
Julian plans to steal money from an automated teller machine. He gets his two best friends, Ricky and Bubbles, to help him succeed in the operation and get rich. However, the plan does not go according to plan and they are chased by the police. Bubbles runs off and is spared by the cops, while Ricky and Julian are arrested and get sent to jail for an 18-month term.

Donny, the jail instructor, kicks Ricky and Julian out of jail 26 days early to prevent Ricky from playing goalie for a rival team, giving Donny and his team a chance to win an upcoming jail street-hockey tournament. Ricky and Julian are picked up by Bubbles and Ricky's father, Ray, and are brought back to Sunnyvale Trailer Park, only to be greeted by the trailer-park supervisor Jim Lahey and his shirtless, cheeseburger-loving assistant, Randy.

Ricky decides to get back with his girlfriend Lucy and become a better father to his daughter, Trinity. However, Ricky learns from Lucy's friend Sarah that Lucy has a new job at a strip club and she also got new breast implants and her boss Sonny is a dangerous man. Ricky, Julian, Bubbles, along with Cory & Trevor, go to the strip club where Ricky meets Lucy and Julian flirts with a stripper, Wanda. After the strip club, Ricky becomes determined to do the "Big Dirty", one massive crime with a payout that will allow him to retire, while Julian follows the advice of an inmate he met and begins to steal numerous small amounts of change to stay below the police's radar.

Julian and Wanda go to the movies on their first date. While waiting in the snack line, Julian sees a money machine filled with change and believes he has found a way to combine his idea with Ricky's "Big Dirty" and informs Ricky and Bubbles of the plan. Ricky returns to the strip club to inform Lucy he'd like her and Trinity to live with him as a family. They are interrupted by Sonny however and Ricky leaves when he learns Sonny and Lucy had sex while he was in prison. At a party at J-Roc's trailer Ricky and Lucy reconcile and he proposes to her, which she accepts.

Lahey conspires to have the boys evicted by falsely reporting to his ex-wife Barb that Ricky, Julian, and Bubbles' lot fees are three months behind. To pay the "missing" back rent and avoid eviction the boys decide to do the Big Dirty at the movie theatre but attract unwanted attention when Cory & Trevor accidentally pull a fire-alarm. Despite the attention the boys are able to escape with the change in Ricky's trunk.

At Ricky and Lucy's wedding, Sonny confronts them both with a handgun and shoots at Ricky's car, causing the money to fall out through the bullet holes in the trunk. Police officers George Green and Ted Johnston arrest Wanda for outstanding arrest warrants and she subsequently reports Sonny's firearm usage to the police. Lahey sees the money falling out of the car and reports their theft before chasing them with the police. Lahey and Randy flip their car and the cops crash into Ricky's car, causing the money to fly out.

In court, Ricky argues the photographic evidence only shows Cory & Trevor and that the only evidence of his, Julian and Bubbles' involvement is Lahey's testimony. Ricky then demands Lahey use a breathalyzer to see if Lahey is drunk or not to determine whether he is a credible witness. Lahey is revealed to be drunk and the boys are declared innocent by the judge who also orders the change returned to them since there is no proof it came from criminal activity.

A victorious Ricky tells off Lahey, but this causes the judge to threaten to charge Ricky with contempt of court and to sentence him to a week in jail. Realizing this means he would be sent to jail in time to play in the street hockey tournament, Ricky gets permission to go to jail for a week from Lucy and Trinity before swearing at the judge, Lahey and Randy. Ricky is sentenced to a week in jail for contempt of court. Ricky's team faces Donny's team in the finals and wins due to a key save by Ricky while Cory and Trevor gain the prisoners' respect after "pantsing" Donny in front of everyone.

Ricky, Trinity and Lucy go on to live as a happy family; Bubbles builds a new shed and performs his "Super Cats Catshow"; Julian reunites with Wanda after she finishes her prison sentence; Cory & Trevor drive their snowmobile together; Lahey and Randy continue to supervise the park; J-Roc and Tyrone perform rap shows; and Ray drinks and rolls around in his wheelchair.

Cast

Reception
Trailer Park Boys: The Movie has received mixed to positive reviews. The movie holds a 55% rating, based on 22 critics' reviews, on Rotten Tomatoes.

Box office
Trailer Park Boys was the highest-grossing movie in Canada for its first weekend in release October 7–8, 2006. The movie grossed an estimated $1.3 million at the box office in its opening weekend becoming the 11th top-grossing film in North America for that weekend. It had a per-screen average of $6,632 over the three-day weekend, and played on over 200 screens. As of November 19, 2006, the film had grossed $3.87 million.

Awards and recognition
The movie was nominated in three categories for the 27th Genie Awards in 2007:
 Best Motion Picture
 Best Performance by an Actor in a Supporting Role (Hugh Dillon)
 Best Adapted Screenplay

Soundtrack

"Big Dirty Drums"
"I Fought the Law" covered by The Big Dirty Band (original composition by Sonny Curtis and The Crickets)
"38 Years Old" by The Tragically Hip
"The Spirit of Radio" by Rush
"Scared" by The Tragically Hip
"Trailer Park Life" by J-Roc
"Credulence"
"Sweet Leaf" covered by Alexisonfire (original composition by Black Sabbath)
"All Touch" by Rough Trade
"Shithawks"
"I'm on Fire for You Baby" covered by April Wine (original composition by David Elliott)
"Bobcaygeon" by The Tragically Hip
"Orca" by Wintersleep
"Swamp Water" by Swollen Members
"Ricky's Day in Court"
"Liquor & Whores" by Bubbles & The Shit Rockers
"Heavy Metal Love" by Helix

DVD release
Trailer Park Boys: The Movie is available in Canada on DVD. It was released on February 20, 2007.

Sequels

On August 27, 2008, it was announced by Alliance Films that there was a second TPB movie being filmed. The movie, titled "Countdown To Liquor Day", is a continuation of the final TPB special, "Say Goodnight To The Bad Guys". The film was released in theaters on September 25, 2009. The third and final film in the franchise "Trailer Park Boys: Don't Legalize it!" was released on April 18, 2014.

References

External links
 
 
 

Trailer Park Boys
2006 films
Films set in Nova Scotia
Films shot in Nova Scotia
English-language Canadian films
Canadian comedy films
American comedy films
2006 comedy films
Films based on television series
Films directed by Mike Clattenburg
Alliance Atlantis films
The Montecito Picture Company films
Films about striptease
Films shot in 16 mm film
2000s English-language films
2000s American films
2000s Canadian films